Cloud9 (without a space between "cloud" and "9")
 Cloud9, a professional esports organization based in California that sponsor teams that compete in several games
 Cloud9 (service provider), a mobile phone company in the Isle of Man
 Cloud9 IDE, an open source cloud web-based integrated development environment
 Cloud9, a fictional big-box store in Superstore (TV series)

See also
 Cloud Nine (disambiguation)